Karl Theodor Sapper (6 February 1866 – 29 March 1945) was a German traveller, explorer, antiquarian and linguist, who is known for his research into the natural history, cultures and languages of Central America around the turn of the 20th century.

Sapper spent over twelve years (1888–95) traveling through much of Central America, and in the process published a number of scientific works on aspects from vulcanology to Mesoamerican languages to descriptions and maps of Maya archaeological sites.

Sapper's contributions to the study of Mesoamerican languages include his initial proposal, made in a 1912 paper, which surmised that the highland regions of Chiapas and Guatemala was the location from which the Mayan languages and the Maya peoples later diversified. The assessment of a number of modern linguists places the likely home of the Proto-Mayan language as being centered on the Cuchumatanes highlands of Guatemala, with a subsequent early occupancy of the Chiapas highlands proper.

Sapper is commemorated in the scientific names of two Central American snakes: Amastridium sapperi and Micrurus diastema sapperi.

Footnotes

References

External links
 

1866 births
1945 deaths
German geographers
Linguists from Germany
German Mesoamericanists
Mesoamerican anthropologists
Linguists of Mesoamerican languages
19th-century Mesoamericanists
20th-century Mesoamericanists